Movila Miresii is a commune located in Brăila County, Muntenia, Romania. It is composed of three villages: Esna, Movila Miresii and Țepeș Vodă.

References

Communes in Brăila County
Localities in Muntenia